Cinder is an alternate term for scoria.

Cinder or Cinders may also refer to:

In computing
Cinder (programming library), a C++ programming library for visualization
Cinder, OpenStack's block storage component
Cyber Insider Threat, CINDER, a digital threat method

Other uses
Ember, also called cinder
Cinder (album), by the Dirty Three
Cinder (bear), a bear rescued with burns after 2014 wildfires in Washington, United States
Cinders (1913 film), a 1913 silent film
Cinders (1920 film), a 1920 film starring Hoot Gibson
Cinders (1926 film), a 1926 British film starring Betty Balfour
Cinder (novel), a novel by Marissa Meyer
 Linh Cinder, the character from the novel and The Lunar Chronicles series
Cinder (Killer Instinct), a character in Killer Instinct
Cinders (visual novel), a 2012 visual novel adaption of Cinderella by MoaCube
Cinder toffee, a British name for honeycomb toffee
Cinder, American hard rock band formerly signed to Geffen Records
Cinder Fall, a major antagonist in the animated web series RWBY
Cinder (musician) (born 1961), Scottish musician

See also
Cinder cone, a type of volcano
For Cinder blocks, see Concrete masonry unit
Cynder (disambiguation)